Richard Dorman may refer to:
Richard Dorman (academic administrator), American college president
Richard Lee Dorman (1922–2010), American architect
Richie Dorman (born 1988), Welsh footballer